Nora Mørk (born 5 April 1991) is a Norwegian handball player for Team Esbjerg and the Norwegian national team.

She made her debut on the Norwegian national team on 21 September 2010.

Before joining Team Esbjerg, she played for Bækkelaget, Aalborg DH, Njård, Larvik, Győr, CSM București and Vipers Kristiansand.

Achievements

National team
Olympic Games:
Bronze Medalist: 2016, 2020
World Championship:
Winner: 2015, 2021
Silver Medalist: 2017
European Championship:
Winner: 2010, 2014, 2016, 2020, 2022
Junior World Championship:
Winner: 2010
Junior European Championship:
Winner: 2009

European
EHF Champions League:
Winner: 2010/2011, 2016/2017, 2017/2018, 2018/2019, 2020/2021, 2021/2022

Domestic
Norwegian League:
Winner: 2009/2010, 2010/2011, 2013/2014, 2014/2015, 2015/2016, 2020/2021, 2021/2022
Norwegian Cup:
Winner: 2009, 2010, 2013, 2014, 2015, 2020, 2021
Hungarian Championship:
Winner: 2016/2017, 2017/2018, 2018/2019
Romanian Supercup:
Winner: 2019

Individual awards
MVP
 Most Valuable Player of the Junior European Championship: 2009
 Most Valuable Player of Postenligaen: 2013/2014
 Most Valuable Player of Grundigligaen: 2014/2015, 2015/2016
Top Scorer
 Topscorer of the Summer Olympics: 2016 (62 goals), 2020 (52 goals)
 Topscorer of the European Championship: 2016 (53 goals), 2020 (52 goals), 2022 (50 goals)
 Topscorer of the World Championship: 2017 (66 goals)
All-Star Team
 All-Star Right Back of the European Youth Championship: 2007
 All-Star Right Back of the European Open Championship: 2008
 All-Star Right Back of Eliteserien: 2008/2009
 All-Star Right Back of the Junior European Championship: 2009
 All-Star Right Wing of Eliteserien: 2009/2010
 All-Star Right Wing of Postenligaen: 2010/2011
 All-Star Right Back of Postenligaen: 2013/2014
 All-Star Right Back of the European Championship: 2014, 2016, 2020
 All-Star Right Back of Grundigligaen: 2014/2015, 2015/2016
 All-Star Right Back of the World Championship: 2015, 2017, 2021
 All-Star Right Back of the EHF Champions League: 2015, 2016, 2017, 2021, 2022
 All-Star Right Back of Møbelringen Cup: 2015, 2017
Others
 NISO Best Young Player of the Year: 2008
 Best Rookie of Eliteserien: 2008/2009
 Foreign Handballer of the Year in Hungary: 2017
 Handball-Planet.com All-Star Right Back: 2015, 2016, 2020, 2021
 Handball-Planet.com Player of the Year: 2017, 2021

Personal life
She is the twin sister of Thea Mørk.

She is in a relationship with fellow handballer, Jerry Tollbring.

References

External links
 
 
 Nora Mørk at the Norwegian Handball Federation 
 
 

Norwegian female handball players
1991 births
Living people
Handball players from Oslo
Expatriate handball players
Norwegian twins
Twin sportspeople
Handball players at the 2016 Summer Olympics
Olympic handball players of Norway
Olympic bronze medalists for Norway
Medalists at the 2016 Summer Olympics
Olympic medalists in handball
Norwegian expatriate sportspeople in Denmark
Norwegian expatriate sportspeople in Hungary
Norwegian expatriate sportspeople in Romania
Győri Audi ETO KC players
Handball players at the 2020 Summer Olympics
Medalists at the 2020 Summer Olympics